Peel Region municipal elections, 2018, were part of the larger Ontario municipal elections, that took place on Monday, October 22.

After ballots were cast, Patrick Brown was elected as the mayor of Brampton, Bonnie Crombie re-elected as the mayor of Mississauga and Allan Thompson re-elected as the mayor of Caledon.

The election was intended to be the first ever direct election of the Peel Regional chair. However, the election of this position was cancelled after the Doug Ford government introduced The Better Local Government Act, 2018 (Bill 5) in August 2018.

Open races

Jim Tovey, Mississauga councillor for Ward 1, died suddenly in January 2018. Tovey was in the midst of planning for massive waterfront redevelopment.

In February 2018, Brampton councillor Chris Gibson announced his retirement in Wards 1 & 5. Officially a city councillor, he had been given the city's additional Regional seat for multiple terms. Regional councillor Elaine Moore, from the same wards, announced her retirement in late March.

Gael Miles retirement was made public the evening before the start of registration. Caledon's Doug Beffort retired.

Peel Region chair

Original nomination process

In 2016, the provincial Liberal government announced voters in the 2018 election would elect regional chairs. Across the province, the selection of regional chairs varies, with some regional councils electing chairs while other chairs being selected by councillors. Peel Region traditionally appointed the regional chair from existing councillors.

In early 2018, the candidates for the position of regional chair began to be nominated.

Starting the year "85% sure" he would run, Ron Starr officially announced his intention to run for Regional Chair in late March 2018. Later, after the cancellation of the position, Starr withdrew to run for re-election in Ward 6.

Rumours that were circulating of Patrick Brown running for Regional chair were neither confirmed or denied, when asked by Metroland in May 2018. Brown was accused of sexual misconduct in January, which he denies, forcing his resignation as Progressive Conservative Party of Ontario leader. He moved to Mississauga after being removed from the party caucus. He did not run for re-election as a Barrie MPP in the June provincial election. Patrick Brown also withdrew from the race.

Mississauga councillor Nando Iannicca enrolled in July.

Bob Delaney, former MPP for Mississauga-Streetsville, registered in July. Charles Sousa and Harinder Takhar, also former MPPs, agreed to not run, in an effort to not split the vote.

Registered candidates included:
 Amir S. Ali, Brampton
 Parveen Dalal, Mississauga
 Bob Delaney, Mississauga
 Vitya Sagar Gautam, Brampton
 Marcin Huniewicz, Brampton
 Nando Iannicca, Mississauga
 Masood Khan, Brampton
 Ken Looy, Brampton
 Gurpreet Pabla, Brampton

A shift in Ontario's government after the provincial elections, saw Doug Ford announce the cancellation of the voter elected position of regional chair in Peel.

While this prompted Brown to pull his Chair nomination, to run for Mayor of Brampton, Delaney continued his campaign, noting that the law had yet to pass.

Incumbent Frank Dale has indicated he may change his mind on retirement, according to The Mississauga News.

Appointment process

TVO journalist Steve Paikin has heard suggestion of the following candidates:

 Nando Iannicca
 Linda Jeffrey
 Gael Miles
 Elaine Moore
 Charles Sousa

Former Caledon Regional councillor Barb Shaughnessy, who had run for Mayor of Caledon, indicated that she would not be pursuing the position.

Brampton

Brampton had 313,273 eligible voters during the 2018 election. A total of 169 voting locations were open across the city.

Mayor

In October 2017, incumbent Brampton Mayor Linda Jeffrey announced her intent to run for a second term.

Real estate lawyer Wesley Jackson was noted in a February 2018 Peel Daily News article as "hoping to become Brampton's next mayor."

In July, John Sprovieri announced his intention to run for Mayor of Brampton. Omar Mansoury withdrew.

On Election Day on October 22, Patrick Brown was declared the winner.

Debates

Brampton Board of Trade is hosting debates of city council candidates throughout the day on September 17, 2018, through live stream, concluding with a Mayoral debate. Brown, Gosal, Jackson, Jeffrey, and Sprovieri were invited to the event. Questions were pre-selected from membership. According to the Guardian, the majority of the event saw "Brown and Sprovieri focusing much of their attention on Jeffrey's record and vice versa."

The first Mayoral debate to allow physical attendance will be held September 20, 2018, at Sheridan College, Davis Campus, through The Pointer, an online news outlet for Brampton.

Brampton Focus hosted a debate on September 25 at the Rose Theatre Brampton, inviting Jeffrey, Brown, Gosal, and Sprovieri. Media reports suggest that the debate was often drowned out by cheering and jeering.

A debate was held by the Brampton Real Estate Board on October 4. All candidates were in attendance.

Prime Asia TV Canada hosted a debate on October 18.

Endorsements

Patrick Brown

 Bill Davis, former Premier of Ontario
 Garnett Manning, former Brampton City Councillor
 Victor Oh, Canadian Senator

Linda Jeffrey

 Richard Ciano, former Ontario PC Party president
 Michael Diamond, Doug Ford's campaign manager
 Ken Zeise, former Ontario PC Party president
 MPPs Prabmeet Sarkaria, Gurratan Singh, Sara Singh, and Kevin Yarde
 MPs Ruby Sahota and Sonia Sidhu

Jeffrey held a fundraiser at the Albany Club of Toronto, a venue associated with the Conservative Party.

Polling
Forum Research, released October 19, 2018

Incumbent Linda Jeffrey and candidate Patrick Brown both polled at 40%, John Sprovieri polled at 7%, Wesley Jackson at 5%, Bal Gosal at 4%, Vinod Kumar Mahesan at 4%, and Mansoor Ameersulthan at 1%.

Mainstreet Research, taken October 19, 2018

Mainstreet's numbers were based on decided voters; 5.6% of voters were voting for other candidates. The complete survey found 17.4% of all voters were undecided.

Regional council

Ward 1 & 5

Moffat, Rai, Russo, and Vicente attended the Brampton Board of Trade debate.

Of the candidates, only McClelland has held political office, as a Liberal MPP. He surrendered his law license in 2015, after allegations of professional misconduct.

Russo is a citizen member of the city's Committee of Adjustment, serving as its chair.

Ward 2 & 6

Bains, Campbell, Jones, and Palleschi attended the Brampton Board of Trade debate.

Ward 3 & 4

Martin Medeiros won the wards over Shan Gill in 2014, by 100 votes. Incumbent Martin Medeiros lived in Mississauga in 2014, but began a move to Brampton, allowing him to run in the election. Resident Peter Bailey filed a legal proceeding to try and remove Medeiros from office, but was unsuccessful. The action was in advance of a vote on the then-Hurontario Main Light Rail Transit project, which Medeiros wanted and Bailey did not.

Former incumbent John Sanderson is a nominee for 2018; he ran for Mayor of Brampton in 2014, finishing second. Sanderson has noted that the 2018 campaign is the "dirtiest" he's experienced, blaming Medeiros for the tone.

Grewal, Kus, Medeiros, and Sanderson attended the Brampton Board of Trade debate.

Ward 7 & 8

Pat Fortini is the incumbent for the wards.

Cody Vatcher has been critical of Mayor Jeffrey, suggesting that she "simply never learned to graciously accept defeat," when her votes were defeated. He also campaigned on standing up to an incumbent who hasn't “stood up for our fair share” and “rolled out the red carpet” for certain health care announcements.

Bruce Marshall has the endorsement of retiring incumbent Gael Miles.

All of the candidates attended the Brampton Board of Trade debate.

Ward 9 & 10

All three candidates attended the Brampton Board of Trade debate.

Amratlal Mistry withdrew from the race.

City council

Ward 1 & 5
 Sanjeev Bansal
 Princess Boucher
 Abdul Qayyum Chaudhry
 Imtiaz Haider
 Harmanpreet Mankoo
 Karanjit Singh Pandher
 Don Patel
 Joe Pimentel
 Daryl Romeo
 Rowena Santos
 Josephine Tatangelo

Boucher, Pimentel, Santos, and Tatangelo attended the Brampton Board of Trade debate.

Pimentel spent 30 years as a City of Brampton employee.

Ward 2 & 6
 Jermaine Chambers
 Ojie F. Eghobor
 Paul Mann
 Jim McDowell
 Lisa Pearce
 M. Joseph Shaji
 Joe Sidhu
 Anwar Warsi
 Doug Whillans, incumbent

Gurpreet Kaur Bains has withdrawn.

Chambers, Mann, and Pearce attended the Brampton Board of Trade debate. Whillans, chair of a hospital fundraiser golf tournament, was unable to attend. The tournament was scheduled in March.

Ward 3 & 4
 Jeff Bowman, incumbent
 Parin Choksi
 Harpreet Singh Hansra
 Omar Mansoury
 Ryan Rennie
 Nishi Sidhu
 Tanveer Singh

Hansra and Rennie attended the Brampton Board of Trade debate. Incumbent Bowman was unable to attend, due to the debate being scheduled against a hospital fundraising golf tournament, of which he is vice-chair, and had been scheduled since March. Candidate Nishi Sidhu also cited a "previous engagement", and Omar Mansoury accepted the invitation but did not attend.

Bowman has taken time off work at City Hall to campaign, noting that other incumbents continued to collect a wage during their campaigning.

Ward 7 & 8
 Karla Bailey
 Harveen Dhaliwal
 Sam Kunjicka
 Drew Riedstra
 Cheryl Rodricks
 Gurvinder Singh
 Martin Singh
 Mokshi Virk
 Charmaine Williams

Martin Singh and Charmaine Williams were in attendance at the Brampton Board of Trade debate.

Dhaliwal's election advertising is shared with Region incumbent Pat Fortini.

Ward 9 & 10
 Mangaljit Dabb
 Michael Farquharson
 Dharmaveer Gohil
 Mahendra Gupta
 Rohit Sidhu
 Harkirat Singh
 Naresh Tharani

Dabb, Farquharson, Singh, and Tharani attended the Brampton Board of Trade debate whilst various other prominent debates have included Singh, Dabb, Gupta and Sidhu among the candidates.

Caledon

Mayor

In January 2018, Allan Thompson confirmed that he'd be seeking re-election.

Mayor, registered candidates
 Kelly Darnley
 Barb Shaughnessy
 Allan Thompson, incumbent

Debates

On September 24, the candidates discussed Bolton development at the Inglewood Community Centre.

A Mayoral debate, which would have also been a debate for Ward 5 councillors, was scheduled and cancelled. A resident organized a new debate, for October 9. The event had extensive debate on a new paramedic deployment model.

Council

Rob Mezzapelli and Doug Beffort are both retiring from area council. Gord McClure has yet to announce intent.

Ward 1 Area Councillor
 Dwayne Jackson
 Lynn Kiernan
 Robert Rees
 Mauro Testani

William Motley-Bailey was registered, but withdrew.

Ward 1 Regional Councillor
 William Motley-Bailey
 Ian Sinclair
 Tom Sweeney
 Jim Wallace

Ward 2 Area Councillor
In 2022, Singh won the NDP riding nomination for Brampton North, supplanting incumbent MPP Kevin Yarde.

 Brian Dunn
 Christina Early
 Christopher Gilmer
 John N. Rutter
 Sandeep Singh

Ward 2 Regional Councillor

Downey's campaign literature included free children's passes for the Brampton Fall Fair, passes available for free at schools and stores. Corrigan has objected to the practice, as a possible breach of municipal campaign laws.

 Kevin Corrigan
 Johanna Downey, incumbent

Ward 3 & 4 Area Councillor
 Cheryl Connors
 Nick deBoer, incumbent

Ward 3 & 4 Regional Councillor
 Derek Clark
 Jennifer Innis, incumbent

Ward 5 Area Councillor

Candidates for Ward 5 Regional and Area Councillor, as well as Mayoral candidates, will appear in a debate organized by a resident, after a scheduled debate was cancelled.

 Steve Conforti
 Joe Luschak
 Tony Rosa

Ward 5 Regional Councillor
 Annette Groves, incumbent
 Angela Panacci

Mississauga

During the campaign, former Mississauga News editor John Stewart noted that the election was marked by a dearth of information or debates, in contrast to previous elections.

Mayor

Bonnie Crombie was the incumbent and re-elected with a substantial majority on October 22, 2018.

Kevin J. Johnston announced his intention to run in March 2018. Peel Regional Police charged Johnston in July 2017 with "willfully promoting hatred, a charge under the Criminal Code of Canada that carries a maximum penalty of two years in jail," according to Mississauga News. Johnston withdrew his mayoral candidacy on July 25 and registered to run for Ward 9 city councillor instead. Then on July 26, withdrew his councillor candidacy and re-registered as a mayoral candidate. Johnston stated in September to be talking with four organizations a day. Johnston ran for the same position in the previous election, placing 11th out of 15.

Debates

University of Toronto Mississauga Students’ Union hosted a debate on October 4, that was attended by Chapman, Crombie, Lee, Pouragheli, and Rizvi. They confirmed that Johnston was not invited.

Council

Ward 1

Dave Cook was the appointed incumbent for Ward 1. As per promise on receiving the position, he did not stand for election in the 2018 contest. Cook replaced elected councillor Jim Tovey, who died in January 2018.

Former Conservative Party of Canada federal MP Brad Butt, currently the Mississauga Board of Trade Director of Government Relations, is a notable candidate. Butt also considered running in Ward 6, but changed his intentions when Ron Starr re-entered that race, after the cancellation of the Regional Chair election.

Kristian Velkoski withdrew to run for a public school board trustee.

An all-candidates debate was held September 19, by ratepayers' groups; Marco Pedri did not attend. Topics discussed including speeding reduction, the Lakeview zoning by-law, and cannabis stores. The ward was later profiled by Mississauga News. Three residents' associations held another debate, featuring Burke, Butt, Dasko, Hart, Roque and Setaram. The remaining candidates, Mancini and Pedri, did not attend.

Ward 2

The incumbent is Karen Ras. She was unopposed until the final week of nominations.

Ward 3

The ward incumbent is Chris Fonseca.

Ward 4

The ward incumbent is John Kovac.

Ward 5
The Ward 5 incumbent is Carolyn Parrish.

Nikki Clarke was registered as a candidate, but disqualified. Clarke had waited until the last day of the nomination period to file her papers, and was soliciting signatures from City staff. This prompted incumbent Carolyn Parrish to ask for a review of the paperwork by the Clerk's department. A total of 8 discrepancies were found in signatures, and the nominee was not allowed to replace those signatures. Clarke came a close second in the 2018 provincial election, running for the NDP in Mississauga—Malton.

Some of the candidates talked to the Mississauga News about issues important to them. Malton Community Building Project hosted a candidate event on October 9.

Ward 6

Incumbent councillor Ron Starr was in his third term on council when on March 28 at a city council session he announced his intention to run for the newly elected Region of Peel Chair. Fourteen candidates entered the race to succeed Starr for the open seat with Joe Horneck being the first to register. July 23 one week before the filing deadline Starr decided to drop out of contention for Regional Chair with that race had 10 candidates including former PC leader Patrick Brown (now Brampton Mayor) and Starr re-registered for his incumbent ward, suggesting that he could do more in his existing position then as regional chair. 
Starr was successful in winning re-election with Ward 6 by a margin of 347 votes proving the closest contest in the city, even though two other wards had no incumbents. Mississauga News columnist John Stewart summarized the race by saying most of the city was a status quo election however "Horneck's loss is more politically impressive than most wins elsewhere. He almost unseated an entrenched council vet in a stable ward. As it is, he's Ward 6 councillor in waiting."

Tahir Ali, Syed Mohammad Jaffery, Fazli Manan, and Avtar Minhas have withdrawn.

Ward 7

Incumbent councillor Nando Iannicca retired from this riding, and re-emerged later in the nomination period as a candidate for Chair of the Region of Peel.

Dipika Damerla, former MPP for Mississauga East—Cooksville and Minister of Seniors Affairs, announced her candidacy for the ward in mid-July.

Ward 8

The incumbent is Matt Mahoney. He was unopposed until the final week of nominations.

Ward 9

The incumbent is Pat Saito. She was unopposed until the final week of nominations.

Kevin J. Johnston was briefly nominated in the ward.

Ward 10

Candidate Mazin Al-Ezzi got into an extended spat with a Ward 10 resident over lawn sign, using "derogatory language" and insulting "the residents repeatedly." Incumbent Sue McFadden described the incident as "scary", while Al-Ezzi says that the resident tried to goad him on every time he intended to leave.

Ward 11

The incumbent in the ward is George Carlson.  The candidates have talked to Mississauga News about issues important to them.

Peel District School Board

Brampton Wards 1, 5

 Claudette Alcock
 Rajwinder Ghuman
 David Green, incumbent
 Yusuf Khan
 Rita Persaud
 Stan Taylor

Brampton Wards 2, 6

 Arun Thomas Alex
 Alex Battick
 William Davies
 Harjot Singh Gill
 Andrew Mendoza
 Mansoor Mirza
 Faraz Saleem
 Raman Vasudev
 Odoi Yemoh

 The incumbent is Suzanne Nurse.

Brampton Wards 3, 4

 Shahbaz Altaf
 Prabhjot Kainth
 Harbandna Kaur
 Kathy McDonald, incumbent
 Seema Shah
 Faisal Tahir
 Radha Tailor

Hiteshkumar Prajapati, Raman Rakkar, and Vipul Shah withdrew their nominations.

Brampton Wards 7, 8

 Zain Ali
 Carrie Andrews, incumbent
 Andrea Francis-Bucknor
 Michael J. Gyovai
 Lynne Lazare
 Garner F. Liverpool
 Jashan Singh

Brampton Wards 9, 10

 Chetan Brahmbhatt
 Albert Evans
 Janice Gordon
 Theresa Guidolin
 Satpaul Singh Johal
 Mazhar Khan
 Ashman Khroad
 Sia Lakhanpal
 Khushpal Pawar
 Dipal Shah
 Balbir Sohi
 Shilpa Vij-Sharma

 Harkirat Singh, incumbent, is running for council.

Caledon

Basmat and Cameron debated the issues at an October 9 event.

 Dmytro Basmat
 Stan Cameron, incumbent
 Amandeep Singh

Mississauga Ward 1, 7

 Husain Aboghodieh
 Paul Liu
John Marchant
 Dalia Morad
 Maxamed Ibraahim Osso
 Catherine Soplet
 Suresh Subramaniam
 Kristian Velkoski
 John F. Walmark

Incumbent Janet McDougald has announced her retirement.

Mississauga Ward 2, 8

 Charles Chen
 Minh Goi
 Meredith Johnson
Brad MacDonald, incumbent
 Jasjit Singh

Mississauga Ward 3, 4

 Vijay Brahmbhatt
 Ahmed Jalal
Sue Lawton, incumbent
 Asha Luthra
 Naila Mahmood
 Norma Fay Nicholson
 Lovely Shankar

Mississauga Ward 5

Susan Benjamin
 Avtar Ghotra
 Ryan Gurcharn
 Bassam Johar
 Arwinder Kalsi
 Jal Panthaky
 Rajakumaran Ponraj
 Sarah Walji

Rick Williams was the incumbent.

Mississauga Ward 6, 11

 Raj Chopra
 Imrana Choudry
Robert Crocker, incumbent
 Tina Daid
 Jith Dravin
 Glynis D'Souza
 Dharmarajah Gnanakumar
 Harjinder Jheetey
 David Li
 Mian Omer Rasheed
 George Varghese

Hasan Imam has withdrawn.

Mississauga Ward 9, 10

 John Bebawy
Nokha Dakroub, incumbent
 Victoria Ghandour
 LeeAnn Lloyd
 Tahir Malik
 Christopher Stuart Taylor

Lili Schermel has withdrawn.

Dufferin-Peel Catholic District School Board

Brampton Wards 1, 3, 4

 Anna da Silva, incumbent
 Hope Irabor Dion
 Patrick J. Doran
 Cheryl Roy

Brampton Wards 2, 5, 6

 Darryl Brian D'Souza, incumbent
 Damien Joseph
 Theresa Laverty
 Neville Mant
 Vincenzo Siciliano

Brampton Wards 7, 8, 9, 10

Incumbent Shawn Xaviour was declared by acclamation.

Caledon/Dufferin

A trustee candidate debate was held on October 9, however only Roman showed up for the event.

 Frank Di Cosola, incumbent
 Sheralyn Roman

Mississauga Ward 1, 3

Incumbent Mario Pascucci was declared by acclamation.

Mississauga Ward 2, 8

Sharon M. Hobin, incumbent
 Matthew Kornas

Mississauga Ward 4

 John Coletti
 Carmela Kapeleris
 Biju Pappachan
Stefano Pascucci
 Miroslaw Ruta
 Mathew Thomas

 Anna Abbruscato is the incumbent.

Mississauga Ward 5

 Margaret Pakula
 Caroline Roach
Thomas Thomas, incumbent

Mississauga Ward 6, 11

Luz del Rosario, incumbent
 Bismarck Gonsalves
 Sabeena Philip

Glynis D'Souza withdrew.

Mississauga Ward 7

Incumbent Bruno Iannicca was declared by acclamation.

Mississauga Ward 9, 10

 Tom Cook
Brea Corbet
 Tomasz Glod
 Mathew Jacob
 Vlad Kagramanov
 John G. Kennedy
 Nestor Pereira

 The incumbent is Esther O'Toole.

French school boards

Trustee, Conseil scolaire Viamonde
 Yvon Rochefort
 Goran Saveski
 Qandeel Tariq Shah

Trustee, Conseil scolaire catholique MonAvenir
 Genevieve Grenier
 Blaise Liaki

References

External links
 Brampton Votes 2018 (official website)
 News coverage: Brampton Guardian, Bramptonist
 Town of Caledon 2018 Municipal Election (official website)
 City of Mississauga Municipal Election (official website)

Peel
Regional Municipality of Peel